Igor Sijsling was the defending champion but decided to compete in the 2013 ABN AMRO World Tennis Tournament instead.
Marius Copil defeated Marc Gicquel 7–6(11–9), 6–4 in the final to win the title.

Seeds

Draw

Finals

Top half

Bottom half

References
 Main Draw
 Qualifying Draw

Open BNP Paribas Banque de Bretagne - Singles
2013 Singles